Massilia cf. timonae is a Massilia timonae-like, Gram-negative, aerobic bacterium from the genus Massilia and family of Oxalobacteraceae which was isolated from human patients.

References

Burkholderiales
Undescribed species